Bagor is a town with Sub-Tehsil in Mandal tehsil of Bhilwara district of Rajasthan State, India.

Prehistoric Housing Site 
Bagor (Rajasthan) on the river Kothari is the largest Mesolithic site in India and has been horizontally excavated. Bagor has three cultural phases. On the basis; of radiocarbon dating phase I or the earliest phase of culture has been placed between 5000-2000 B.C. . 
Here Mesolithic five human skeletons which were buried in a planned manner. The earliest evidence of domestication of animals and fire found here.

History 

Sajjan Singh  (18 July 1859 – 23 December 1884), was the Maharana of princely state of Udaipur (r. 1874 – 1884). He was a son of Shakti Singh form the  Bagor branch of Mewar and was adopted by Maharana Shambhu Singh.

Tourist places 

Gurudwara Shri Kalgidhar Bagor Sahib - Bagor is Sh. Guru Gobind Singh Ji stayed here when he was on journey to Punjab. This historical Gurdwara is situated at a distance of 20 km from town Mandal in town Bagor of Tehsil Mandal, District Bhilwara, Rajasthan. This holy place has been blessed by the visit of the Tenth Sikh Guru, Guru Gobind Singh Ji.

Demographics  

According to 2011 census Average Sex Ratio of Bagor village is 991 which is higher than Rajasthan state average of 928. Child Sex Ratio for the Bagor as per census is 894, higher than Rajasthan average of 888. 

Bagor village has lower literacy rate compared to Rajasthan. In 2011, literacy rate of Bagor village was 62.69 % compared to 66.11 % of Rajasthan. In Bagor Male literacy stands at 78.56 % while female literacy rate was 46.94 %. 

As per constitution of India and Panchyati Raaj Act, Bagor village is administrated by Sarpanch (Head of Village) who is elected representative of village.

Infrastructure

Roads connectivity 
Bagor is situated 27km away from sub-district headquarter Mandal and 31km away from district headquarter Bhilwara and 125KM away from Udaipur.

Communication facilities 
Bagor post office

Education 
Government Senior Secondary School Bagor
Swami Vivekanand Govt. Model School Bagor
Prem Devi Bed government senior secondary girls school Bagor
Ward no. 5 government primary school

Book 
Bagor - A Late Mesolithic Settlement in North-West India

References

Villages in Bhilwara district